The El Salvador national baseball team is a national team of El Salvador and is controlled by the Federación Salvadoreña de Béisbol.  It represents the nation in senior-level men's international competition.  The team is a member of the COPABE.

Central American Games  
  :  3rd
  : Nil
  :  1st 
  : Nil
  : 
  :   3rd
  : 
  : 
  :   3rd
  :  3rd

References

National baseball teams
baseball
Baseball in El Salvador